Mỏ Cày is a township (thị trấn) and capital of Mỏ Cày Nam District, Bến Tre Province, Vietnam.

Until February 2009, it was the capital of former Mỏ Cày District.

References

Populated places in Bến Tre province
Communes of Bến Tre province
District capitals in Vietnam
Townships in Vietnam